Goran Gogić (24 April 1986 – 3 July 2015) was a Serbian professional footballer.

Career
Born in Vrbas, Serbia, Yugoslavia, he played with FK Jedinstvo Ub, FK Čukarički, FK Napredak Kruševac, FK Javor Ivanjica and FK Jagodina before joining Red Star Belgrade in summer of 2013.

He signed a contract with Red Star Belgrade in August 2013.

Death
On 3 July 2015, Gogić collapsed and lost consciousness after a training session with Qingdao Hainiu. He died at 22:25 local time (14:25 UTC) on the same day.

Honours
Jagodina
 Serbian Cup: 2013

Red Star Belgrade
 Serbian SuperLiga: 2013–14

References

1986 births
2015 deaths
Association football players who died while playing
People from Vrbas, Serbia
Serbian footballers
FK Jedinstvo Ub players
FK Jagodina players
FK Čukarički players
FK Javor Ivanjica players
FK Napredak Kruševac players
Qingdao F.C. players
Red Star Belgrade footballers
Serbian SuperLiga players
China League One players
Expatriate footballers in China
Serbian expatriate sportspeople in China
Association football midfielders
Sport deaths in China